Štefan Kardoš (born 1966) is a Slovene writer. He lives in Murska Sobota and works as a teacher at the Bilingual Secondary School in Lendava.

In 2008 Kardoš won the Kresnik Award for his novel Rizling polka (Riesling Polka).

Novels
 Sekstant (2002), co-written with Robert Titan Felix and Norma Bale
 Rizling polka (2007)
 Pobočje sončnega griča  (2010)

References

External links
Kardoš's publisher, Litera publishing house Maribor, official site
Review of Rizling polka in Mladina 2008/03

Slovenian writers
Living people
1966 births
Kresnik Award laureates
People from Murska Sobota
Prekmurje Slovenes